Spectrochimica Acta may refer to:

 Spectrochimica Acta Part A
 Spectrochimica Acta Part B